The Sacred Heart of Jesus is an oil painting by the Italian artist Pompeo Batoni, painted in 1767.

Description
The work is painted by Pompeo Batoni in 1767. In this artwork, he depicts Christ wearing a red tunic, which symbolises the colour of blood, martyrdom and humanity; and a blue mantle which symbolise the colour of heaven and Christ's divinity. Batoni represented Jesus with long hair and a short beard, holding in his left hand an inflamed heart with a crowned thorns and with a cross at the top. Batoni's artwork became popular for the official image for the devotion to the Sacred Heart of Jesus.

The portrait is the most notable painting of the Sacred Heart of Jesus. Batoni was born 18 years after St. Margaret Mary Alacoque died, the saint who inspires the artist of all Sacred Heart of Jesus portraits.

Batoni was motivated in painting the Sacred Heart of Jesus by the supposed apparition of Jesus to St Margaret Mary Alacoque under the title of the Sacred Heart. The apparition was said to have occurred when St Margaret prayed to Jesus before the Blessed Sacrament during the feast of St. John the Evangelist in 1673. His Sacred Heart was depicted by the saint with these following words: "The Divine Heart was presented to me in a throne of flames, more resplendent than a sun, transparent as crystal, with this adorable wound. And it was surrounded with a crown of thorns, signifying the punctures made in it by our sins, and a cross above signifying that from the first instant of His Incarnation, [...] the cross was implanted into it [...]."

The portrait is an altarpiece placed above the altar in the northern side chapel of the Church of the Gesù in Rome.

Another series of large paintings of the Sacred Heart of Jesus by Batoni is commissioned for the Basilica of the Sacred Heart of Jesus in Lisbon by the Portuguese queen in the 1780s.

References

1767 paintings
Paintings by Pompeo Batoni
Paintings depicting Jesus
Altarpieces